Franklin Field (formerly known as Routine Field and briefly as Milkmen Stadium) is a baseball park in Franklin, Wisconsin, which is part of the Milwaukee metropolitan area. The ballpark was built on the site of a former landfill. It is the home of the Milwaukee Milkmen, an independent professional baseball team playing in the American Association of Professional Baseball, and it will be the home of the NCAA Division I University of Wisconsin-Milwaukee Panthers baseball team. The ballpark opened with the Milkmen losing 3–2 loss in 11 innings to the Gary SouthShore RailCats on June 24, 2019, a month after the first home game for the Milkmen was played at Kokomo Municipal Stadium in Indiana.

Naming rights dispute 
The naming rights were originally held by Routine Baseball, a baseball apparel brand based in Franklin. However, in August 2019, Routine Baseball filed a lawsuit against ROC Ventures, arguing that the letter of intent outlining the terms of the naming-rights deal was never officially signed and that ROC Ventures should not have moved forward with the deal. They claimed ROC Ventures never had formal permission to use and profit off its branding, and in addition owed them more than $100,000 in unpaid invoices. Later, ROC Ventures filed a countersuit, alleging that Routine not only failed to pay naming rights, but also did not pay royalties or commitments due after Routine took over Lifestyle Sports Apparel and Korked (a ROC Ventures enterprise that created apparel for Joe Maddon's foundation). In November, the two parties reached a settlement and all Routine branding and signage was removed from the ballpark. In January 2020, the Milkmen were actively searching for a new naming-rights partner. In June 2020, ROC Ventures announced it had forged a partnership with the Franklin Tourism Commission to rename the ballpark from Milkmen Stadium to Franklin Field and build a visitor's center nearby.

In May 2021, Wisconsin Lutheran College held a commencement ceremony for their winter 2020 and spring 2021 graduates at Franklin Field.

References

Baseball venues in Wisconsin
Sports venues in Milwaukee
Minor league baseball venues
College baseball venues in the United States
Buildings and structures in Milwaukee County, Wisconsin
Milwaukee Panthers baseball
Sports venues completed in 2019